Sven Justus Fredrik Wollter (11 January 1934 – 10 November 2020) was a Swedish actor, writer, and political activist. Wollter is one of the most renowned Swedish actors, he was awarded Best Swedish actor twice. In his native country, he became widely known through his role as Madame Flod's son Gusten in Swedish Television's adaption of The People of Hemsö by August Strindberg in 1966. Later he had several notable roles, including in 1976 when he played Detective Sergeant Lennart Kollberg in Bo Widerberg's film The Man on the Roof. For international viewers, he is best known for his role Victor in the dramatic film The Sacrifice by Andrei Tarkovsky, and for a wider television audience as the retired Detective Chief Inspector Van Veeteren in the cinematic adaptations of Håkan Nesser's police novels.

Biography
Sven Wollter was born in Gothenburg, Sweden. He was the son of editor Kjell Wollter (1884–1950) and Elsa, née Ekwall (1905–1980). After studying at Gothenburg City Theatre's student school 1953–1957, Wollter worked at a number of smaller Swedish theaters such as the Pionjärteatern 1954-1958 and the Bygdeteatern 1959. He was later employed at The Riksteatern 1960–1961, The Norrköping City Theatre 1961–1963, The Vasateatern 1964–1966 and The Swedish Television Theatre 1966–1967. He then returned to The Gothenburg City Theater where he performed 1967–1983, then at the Folkteatern i Gävleborg 1983–1986 followed by The Stockholm City Theatre as of 1986.

Wollter starred in many films such as Andrei Tarkovsky's The Sacrifice (1986), Bo Widerberg's The Man on the Roof (1976) and The Man from Majorca (1984), Colin Nutley's House of Angels (1992), and Bille August's Jerusalem (1996), based on the novel by Selma Lagerlöf. For his roles in The Man from Majorca and Sista leken he won the award for Best Actor at the 20th Guldbagge Awards.

He appeared in television series such as The People of Hemsö (1966), based on the 1887 novel of the same name by August Strindberg, and Raskens (1976), based on the 1927 novel of the same name by Vilhelm Moberg, which helped launch Wollter's career. In later years he has played Van Veeteren in Håkan Nesser's thriller series. He has also been in many plays. Wollter has starred in Hollywood productions such as John McTiernan's The 13th Warrior (1999), in which he played a Viking chief.

Political activism 

Wollter was active in the Swedish communist movement since his youth and was a longtime member of the fringe Swedish Communist Party (formerly KPML(r)). His activities included the theatre ensemble Fria Proteatern and the successful Tältprojektet, The Tent Project, a musical theatre performance based on the history of the Swedish working class that toured the country the summer of 1977. In 2018, he received the controversial Lenin Award of 100,000 Swedish krona (about 10,000 euro], a cultural award named after Vladimir Lenin.

Personal life 
Wollter had five children; Ylva (1962–1992) and Stina Wollter (born 1964) together with Annie Jenhoff, Lina Wollter together with Evabritt Strandberg, Karl Seldahl (born 1975) together with Viveka Seldahl and the youngest child Magnus together with Maria Lindgren. From 2003 until his death he was married to Lisa Wede.

Death 
Wollter died on 10 November 2020, in Luleå, Sweden, from complications caused by COVID-19 which he had been infected by during a visit to Stockholm. Prior to contracting the coronavirus, Wollter was diagnosed with COPD according to his daughter Stina Wollter. He was 86 years old.

Filmography

1959: Rider in Blue as Press Photographer (uncredited)
1966: Hemsöborna (TV Mini Series)  as Gusten
1967: I Am Curious (Yellow)  as Captain (uncredited)
1968: Jag älskar, du älskar  as Sten
1969: Nej  (Short)
1973: Ett köpmanshus i skärgården (TV Series)  as Janne
1974: Rymmare  (TV Movie) as Klas
1975: Gyllene år (TV Series)  as Björn Bjurhoff
1975: The White Wall  as Kjell Larsson
1976: Raskens (TV Series)  as Gustav 'Raskens' Rask
1976: The Man on the Roof  as Lennart Kollberg
1978: Strandfyndet (TV Series)  as Direktör Sallberg
1979: Linus eller Tegelhusets hemlighet  as Daniel
1979: Charlotte Löwensköld  as Foundry Proprietor Schagerström
1981: Sista budet  as Police Inspector
1981: Kallocain (TV Mini Series)  as Leo Kall
1983: Jacob Smitaren  as Doctor
1983: Profitörerna (TV Series) as Jarnebring
1984: Sista leken  as Viktor
1984: The Man from Majorca  as Inspector Jarnebring
1985: Havlandet as Matti
1986: The Sacrifice  as Victor
1986: I lagens namn  as Jarnebring
1987: En film om kärlek  as Peter
1987: Friends  as Zeb
1988: Ein Treffen mit Rimbaud as Hinrich
1988: Enkel resa  as Johannes
1988: Sweetwater  as Doc
1989: Husbonden – piraten på Sandön (TV Movie)  as Peter
1989-1991: Tre kärlekar (TV Series)  as Eskil Enekrona
1990: Smykketyven as Jan Ström
1991: Menekse Koyu as Kerem
1992: House of Angels  as Axel Flogfält
1993: Dockpojken  as Fadern
1994: House of Angels – The Second Summer  as Axel Flogfält
1995: Alfred  as Alfred Nobel
1996: Jerusalem  as Stor-Ingmar
1997: Oliver & Company  as Sykes (voice in Swedish redub)
1998: The Tattooed Widow (TV Movie)  as Erik Sandström
1998: Ögat as Poliskommissarien
1998: Ivar Kreuger (TV Series)  as Häradshövding Wallenberg
1999: The 13th Warrior  as King Hrothgar
1999: Sally (TV Series)  as Rolf 'Roffe' Santesson
2000: Det grovmaskiga nätet (TV Series)  as Van Veeteren
2000: A Song for Martin  as Martin
2001: Kaspar i Nudådalen (TV Series)  as Perols Erik
2001: Återkomsten  as Van Veeteren
2001: Kvinna med födelsemärke (TV Series)  as Van Veeteren
2001: Kira's Reason: A Love Story as Kira's Father
2002: Suxxess as Sigvard
2002: Dieselråttor & sjömansmöss  as Mäster Estragon
2002: Treasure Planet as John Silver (voice in Swedish dub) 
2005: Molly i världen as The narrator
2005: Van Veeteren – Carambole  as Van Veeteren
2005: Störst av allt  as Aron P Johansson
2005: Van Veeteren – Münsters fall  as Van Veeteren
2005: Van Veeteren – Borkmanns punkt  as Van Veeteren
2006: Van Veeteren – Moreno och tystnaden  as Van Veeteren
2006: Sigillet  as Vete von Vanders
2006: Van Veeteren – Svalan, Katten, Rosen, Döden  as Van Veeteren
2006: Van Veeteren – Fallet G  as Van Veeteren
2007: Elias: The Little Rescue Boat as The Royal Yacht (Swedish version, voice)
2009: Gnomes and Trolls: The Secret Chamber (Swedish dub)  as Fassa (voice)
2010: House of Angels – Third Time Lucky  as Axel Flogfält
2012: Flimmer   as Barnard
2012: Samlaren (Short)  as Lennart
2015: Våga älska  as Piloten
2017: Solsidan  as Maurtiz Schiller
2018: Videomannen  as Grannen - The Neighbor
2022: The House as Odd Couple Husband

References

External links

1934 births
2020 deaths
People from Gothenburg
Swedish male film actors
Sommar (radio program) hosts
Swedish communists
Best Actor Guldbagge Award winners
20th-century Swedish male actors
21st-century Swedish male actors
Deaths from the COVID-19 pandemic in Sweden